Drennon may refer to:

People
Eddie Drennon (born 1940), American musician
Raleigh Drennon (1908–1965), American football player

Other
Drennon Creek, Henry County, Kentucky, US

See also
Drennan (disambiguation), Irish surname